A lemur is a Malagasy primate.

Lemur may also refer to:

Lemur (genus), a genus of lemur containing only the ring-tailed lemur
Lemurs of Madagascar (book), a field guide published by Conservation International that summarizes what is known about all lemur species
List of lemur species, a list of all the recognized species of lemur
Save the Lemur, a conservation campaign
Lemur-like ringtail possum, a species of Australian marsupial
Lemures, wandering and vengeful spirits of the dead in Roman mythology 
LMTK2 (lemur tyrosine kinase 2), a human gene
Lemur (input device), a musical multitouch controller
Lemur Project, an information retrieval toolkit

LEMUR may refer to:

 Limbed Excursion Mechanical Utility Robot, a rock-climbing autonomous robot being developed by JPL
 League of Electronic Musical Urban Robots, a group of artists and technologists developing robotic musical instruments

See also

 Lemurians (disambiguation)
 Lemuria (disambiguation)